Rodney Adams "Rod" Fletcher was an American former basketball player for the University of Illinois at Urbana–Champaign who was named a consensus First Team NCAA All-American as a senior in 1951–52. A  guard, Fletcher led the Fighting Illini to two straight Big Ten Conference championships as well as two consecutive NCAA tournament Final Four appearances in 1951 and 1952 alongside teammate John "Red" Kerr. He was a two-time All-Big Ten selection in his three varsity seasons, and at the end of his collegiate career Fletcher was selected by the Minneapolis Lakers in the 1952 NBA draft, although he never played professionally.

Fletcher grew up in Champaign, Illinois and attended Champaign Central High School, where he was named second team all-state as a senior in 1948 by the Champaign News Gazette.

See also
1950–51 Illinois Fighting Illini men's basketball team
1951–52 Illinois Fighting Illini men's basketball team

References

Living people
All-American college men's basketball players
American men's basketball players
Basketball players from Illinois
Guards (basketball)
Illinois Fighting Illini men's basketball players
Minneapolis Lakers draft picks
Sportspeople from Champaign, Illinois
1930 births